KUSD may refer to:

 KUSD (FM), a radio station (89.7 FM) licensed to Vermillion, South Dakota, United States
 KUSD-TV, a television station (channel 2 analog/34 digital) licensed to Vermillion, South Dakota, United States
 KUSD (AM), a defunct radio station (690 AM) licensed to Vermillion, South Dakota, United States
 Kenosha Unified School District, a school district based in Kenosha, Wisconsin.
 Kingman Unified School District, a school district based in Kingman, Arizona.